La Ferrière is a former commune in the Isère department in southeastern France. On 1 January 2019, it was merged into the new commune Le Haut-Bréda. It is one of the communes of the Les sept Laux winter sports resort.

Geography
The village is crossed by a little river, the Bréda. It is located near the border with Savoy.

Population
Inhabitants are called Biassus.

See also
Communes of the Isère department

References

Former communes of Isère
Isère communes articles needing translation from French Wikipedia